Berg Brauerei is a traditional brewery located in Berg suburb of Ehingen town in Baden-Württemberg, Germany.

History 
On 12 July 1466 the "Wirtshaus auf dem Berg" ("inn on the mountain") is mentioned in a letter from the Sigismund, Archduke of Austria as the "inn with the right to bake, boil and other butcher’s goods". Since 1757, the Berg Brauerei has been a family property, now in its 9th generation. 

In 2016 the company celebrated its 550th anniversary.

Products 
The annual production is about 30,000 hectoliters including:
all-year beers:
Berg Original
Bert 3 - grain yeast wheat
Berg Special
Braumeister Pils, etc.
seasonal beers:
Berg Marzen
Herbsgold
Berg Weihnachtsbier, etc.

See also 
List of oldest companies

References 
Articles contains text translated from Berg Brauerei on German Wikipedia retrieved on 25 February 2017.

External links 
Homepage in German
Location on Google Maps

Breweries in Germany
Breweries in Baden-Württemberg
Beer brands of Germany
Companies established in the 15th century
15th-century establishments in the Holy Roman Empire